The  is a river which flows through central Tokyo, Japan.

The river is 2.6 km in length originating close to Shibuya Station and passing through Shibuya and Minato wards before merging with the Furu River near Hiroo and flowing into Tokyo Bay near Shiba Koen. The Inner Circular Route is built above the lower course of the river.

The Shibuya River banks are predominantly unlandscaped; the major tributary of the river, the Onden River, originates in Sendagaya and passes largely unnoticed directly under Cat Street in the heart of Ura-Harajuku.  The Onden River merges with the Uda River in central Shibuya forming the Shibuya River which then flows directly under Shibuya Station as a covered concrete drain.

Redevelopment plans for Shibuya Station include the prospect of a more accessible Shibuya River with landscaping and pedestrian access.

See also
 Shibuya, Tokyo
 Harajuku

References

Rivers of Tokyo
Shibuya
Geography of Minato, Tokyo
Rivers of Japan